In computing, WYSIWYG is an acronym for What You See Is What You Get.

The quote "What you see is what you get" was popularized by Geraldine Jones, a character from the television show The Flip Wilson Show. 

WYSIWYG may also refer to:

Music
 WYSIWYG (album), a 2000 album by Chumbawamba
 "WYSIWYG", an instrumental by rock band Clutch from the 2004 album Blast Tyrant

Other uses
 WYSIWYG (TV series), a 1990s CITV series
 WYSIWYG Film Festival, an annual Christian film festival
 WYSIWYG Report, Design and Perform, a suite of visualisation software for theatre lighting design by CAST

See also
What You See Is What You Get (disambiguation)
Whatcha See Is Whatcha Get (disambiguation)